Yevgeni Vladimirovich Golovchenko (born 14 July 1973) is a former Russian football player.

References

1973 births
Living people
Russian footballers
FC Okean Nakhodka players
Russian Premier League players
Association football goalkeepers